The FIFA U-17 World Cup, founded as the FIFA U-16 World Championship, later changed to U-17 in 1991 and to its current name in 2007, is the world championship of association football for male players under the age of 17 organized by Fédération Internationale de Football Association (FIFA). The current champion is Brazil, which won its fourth title at the 2019 tournament on home soil.

History
The FIFA U-17 World Cup is a competition that was inspired by the Lion City Cup that was created by the Football Association of Singapore in 1977. The Lion City Cup was the first under-16 football tournament in the world. Following FIFA's then secretary-general Sepp Blatter's recommendation after he was in Singapore for the 1982 Lion City Cup, FIFA created the FIFA U-16 World Championship.

The first edition was staged in 1985 in China, and tournaments have been played every two years since then. It began as a competition for players under the age of 16 with the age limit raised to 17 from the 1991 edition onwards. The 2017 tournament which was hosted by India became the most attended in the history of the tournament, with the total attendance of the FIFA U-17 World Cup reaching 1,347,133.

Nigeria is the most successful nation in the tournament's history, with five titles and three runners up. Brazil is the second-most successful with four titles and two runners-up. Ghana and Mexico have won the tournament twice.

A corresponding tournament for female players, the FIFA U-17 Women's World Cup, began in 2008, with North Korea winning the inaugural tournament.

Structure
Each tournament consists of a group phase, in which four teams play against one another and standings in the group table decide which teams advance, followed by a knockout phase of successive matches where the winning team advances through the competition and the losing team is eliminated. This continues until two teams remain to contest the final, which decides the tournament winner. The losing semi-finalists also contest a match to decide third place.

From 1985 to 2005 there were 16 teams in the competition, divided into four groups of four teams each in the group phase. Each team played the others in its group and the group winner and runner up qualified for the knockout phase. From 2007 the tournament was expanded to 24 teams, divided into six groups of four teams each. The top 2 places in each group plus the four best third-placed teams advanced to the knockout phase.

Competition matches are played in two 45-minute halves (i.e., 90 minutes in total). In the knockout phase, until the 2011 tournament, if tied at the end of 90 minutes an additional 30 minutes of extra time were played, followed by a penalty shoot-out if still tied. Starting with the 2011 tournament, the extra time period was eliminated to avoid player burnout, and all knockout games progress straight to penalties if tied at the end of 90 minutes.

From 2024 the tournament will take place annually and will have 48 participating teams divided into 4 'mini-tournaments' of 12 teams each divided into 3 groups of 4 with the winners and best runner up qualifying to the MT semi-finals and the 2 winners qualifying to the final. The winner of each MT would qualify to a 'final four' tournament with 2 semi-finals, a third place match and a final to decide the FIFA U17 World Champions.

Qualification
The host nation of each tournament qualifies automatically. The remaining teams qualify through competitions organised by the six regional confederations. For the first edition of the tournament in 1985, all of the teams from Europe plus Bolivia appeared by invitation of FIFA.

Results

Teams reaching the top four

1includes results representing Soviet Union
2includes results representing West Germany

Performances by continental zones

Africa is the most successful continental zone with 7 tournament wins (5 for Nigeria, 2 for Ghana) and 6 times as runner up. Notably the 1993 final was contested by two African teams, when the final has been contested by two teams from the same confederation. The African teams repeated the 1993 final with Mali replacing Ghana (Disqualified for age violation) in 2015 when Nigeria and Mali made it to the last two standing and Nigeria got their sixth win.

South America has 3 tournament wins and has been runner up three times. Additionally Argentina has finished in third place on 3 occasions, Chile has done so on one occasion and Colombia has finished in fourth place twice, but neither of the latter two have ever appeared in the final.

Europe has 4 tournaments wins (1 each for France, USSR, Switzerland and England) and has been runner up 6 times. Spain has been runner up on 4 occasions. Additionally Portugal and Netherlands have won third-place medals in 1989 and 2005 respectively.

The CONCACAF zone has 2 tournament wins (for Mexico in 2005 and 2011), this confederation has reached the final four times (with Mexico).

Asia has 1 tournament win (for Saudi Arabia in 1989), the only time that a team from this confederation has reached the final and the only time an Asian team won a FIFA tournament in male category. (Australia was runner up in 1999 but at that time was in the Oceania Football Confederation).

Oceania has no tournament wins and 1 occasion as runner up (for Australia in 1999). Australia has since moved to the Asian confederation.

This tournament is peculiar in that the majority of titles have gone to teams from outside the strongest regional confederations (CONMEBOL and UEFA). Of the fifteen editions held so far, nine (60 percent of the total) have been won by teams from North and Central America, Africa and Asia.

Awards
The following awards are now presented:
 The Golden Ball is awarded to the most valuable player of the tournament;
 The Golden Boot is awarded to the top goalscorer of the tournament;
 The Golden Glove is awarded to the most valuable goalkeeper of the tournament;
 The FIFA Fair Play Trophy is presented to the team with the best disciplinary record in the tournament.

Records and statistics

See also
 List of association football competitions
 FIFA U-20 World Cup
 FIFA U-17 Women's World Cup

References

External links

  
 World Championship for U-16/U-17 Teams at the RSSSF.com 
 FIFA U17 WC (archived)

 
FIFA World Cup
Youth football competitions
World youth sports competitions
U-17 World Cup
Recurring sporting events established in 1985
U17